Fire Station No. 22 may refer to:

Fire Station No. 22 (Birmingham, Alabama), listed on the National Register of Historic Places (NRHP)
Steam Engine Company No. 22, Louisville, Kentucky, NRHP-listed
Engine Company 22, Washington, D.C., NRHP-listed

See also
List of fire stations